Kevin Godfrey Darlington (born 26 April 1972) is a Guyanese-American cricket coach and former player. He played for Guyana in West Indian domestic cricket from 1995 to 2002, as a right-arm fast-medium bowler. He later played international cricket for the United States from 2010 to 2011. He has since coached at national level in the United States.

Career with Guyana
Darlington made his first-class debut for Guyana in 1995 against Barbados and his List-A debut in the same season against the Leeward Islands. From 1995 to 2002 Darlington represented Guyana in 30 first-class matches, with his final appearance for the side coming against the Leeward Islands. In List-A cricket he represented Guyana in 22 matches from 1995 to 2000, with his final match coming against Bermuda.

In his 30 first-class matches for Guyana he took 79 wickets at a bowling average of 28.79, with three five wicket hauls and best figures of 6/25 against Trinidad and Tobago in 2001. In List-A cricket he took 18 wickets at an average of 25.27, with best figures of 2/14.

Move to America
Following the end of his first-class career with Guyana, Darlington moved to the United States. In 2010 he made his debut for the United States against the UAE in a pre-tournament warm up match for the 2010 ICC World Twenty20 Qualifier. During the tournament Darlington made his full Twenty20 debut against Scotland, where he took 2 wickets as the USA went on to win by 6 wickets. He followed this up by playing matches against Ireland and Afghanistan, both of which the United States lost.

Later in February 2010, Darlington represented the United States in the 2010 ICC World Cricket League Division Five, where he ended the tournament as the leading wicket taker with 14 wickets as the United States gained promotion to the 2010 ICC World Cricket League Division Four in Italy.

Coaching career
In 2020, Darlington was named head coach of the United States national under-19 cricket team.

In 2023, Darlington was named interim head coach of the USA senior team for the 2023 ICC Cricket World Cup Qualifier Play-off in Namibia.

References

External links
Kevin Darlington at Cricinfo
Kevin Darlington at CricketArchive

1972 births
Living people
Guyanese cricketers
American cricketers
Guyana cricketers
Guyanese emigrants to the United States
People from New Amsterdam, Guyana
Coaches of the United States national cricket team